is a Japanese actor who is affiliated with Posters.

Career
Takasugi was scouted by chance at a fireworks display held in Kumamoto Prefecture. In 2009, he debuted in the stage play, Every Little Thing '09 and in 2010 he made his film debut in Hanjiro. 

Started acting as an actor in 2009.

In 2012, he starred in the movie "Quartet" for the first time.

In 2015, he won the Best Newcomer Award at the 36th Yokohama Film Festival for the movie "Bon Lin".

In 2017, he won the 72nd Mainichi Film Awards Sponichi Grand Prix New Face Award for the movie "Before We Vanish".

Filmography

TV series

Films

Awards and nominations

References

External links
 Official profile at Spice Power
 

1996 births
Living people
Japanese male film actors
Actors from Fukuoka Prefecture
21st-century Japanese male actors